Tropical Storm Carol was used for eight tropical cyclones world wide: three in the Atlantic Ocean, four in the Australian region of the Indian Ocean and one in the northwestern Pacific Ocean.

In the Atlantic:
 Hurricane Carol (1953), a Category 5 Cape Verde-type hurricane that made landfall in New Brunswick as a minimal hurricane.
 Hurricane Carol (1954), a Category 3 hurricane that made landfall on Long Island, New York, and then in Connecticut.
 Hurricane Carol (1965), a long-lived Category 1 hurricane that remained in the open ocean.

In the Australian region:
 Cyclone Carol (1965), re-designated Cyclone Daisy by Météo-France after crossing into the south-west Indian basin.
 Cyclone Carol (1972), a severe tropical cyclone that never impacted land.
 Cyclone Carol (1976), remained in the open ocean.
 Cyclone Carol (1980), a severe tropical cyclone that developed southwest of Timor and moved westward through the open ocean; interacted with the weaker Cyclone Dan to its north.

In the northwestern Pacific:
 Typhoon Carol (1947) (T4703), a Category 3 typhoon that passed near the Philippines and then Taiwan.

Carol
Carol
Carol